Vayssière is a French surname. Notable people with the surname include:

Albert Jean Baptiste Marie Vayssière (1854–1942), French invertebrate zoologist
Jean-Luc Vayssière (born 1956), French geneticist

See also
Vaissière (disambiguation)

French-language surnames